KGW (channel 8) is a television station in Portland, Oregon, United States, affiliated with NBC and owned by Tegna Inc. The station's studios are located on Jefferson Street in southwestern Portland, and its transmitter is located in the city's Sylvan-Highlands section. KGW also served as the Portland bureau for co-owned regional news channel Northwest Cable News before it shut down on January 6, 2017.

History

Ownership by The Oregonian
KGW-TV was originally co-owned with KGW radio (620 AM, now KPOJ). (KPOJ was originally on 1330 AM, and was owned by the now defunct Portland Oregon Journal.) The Oregonian newspaper put KGW radio on the air by purchasing an existing transmitter from the Shipowners Radio Service. The U.S. Department of Commerce licensed the radio station, and it began broadcasting on March 25, 1922 (after a test transmission two days earlier). Among the station's early personalities was "The Man of 1000 Voices," Mel Blanc, who debuted on the radio program The Hoot Owls. The station's studios and transmitter were located in The Oregonian Building (of 1892) until 1943, when a fire destroyed them and the station moved to other quarters.  In 1946, KGW added a sister station, KGW-FM on 95.3 MHz (now 100.3 KKRZ). The following year, The Oregonian applied for and received a Federal Communications Commission (FCC) construction permit for a television station, but later returned it in order to focus on its core newspaper business.

The Oregonian sold KGW-AM-FM to North Pacific Television, a consortium of Seattle businesswoman Dorothy Bullitt and five Portland businessmen, on November 1, 1953. Bullitt's King Broadcasting Company, who also owned KING-AM-FM-TV in Seattle, was the largest shareholder in the venture, with a 40 percent stake. Bullitt eventually bought out her partners (and in doing so, became the sole owner of the station).  King Broadcasting wanted to add a television station to KGW-AM-FM. KGW-TV signed on the air on December 15, 1956, on channel 8.  Because KGW radio was an ABC affiliate, KGW-TV also joined the ABC television network in its early years. On April 26, 1959, it swapped affiliations with KPTV (channel 12), becoming an NBC affiliate. (KGW's sister station, KING-TV in Seattle, also switched from ABC to NBC with KOMO-TV at the same time.)

The KGW-TV tower was a prominent victim of the Northwest's historic, and violent Columbus Day Storm on October 12, 1962. The station returned to the air on October 16 using a temporary tower, as well as an antenna on loan from KTNT-TV (now KSTW) of Tacoma, Washington. A new antenna and tower were placed into service on January 28, 1963.

New studios
In January 1964, KGW began building a new broadcast center at 1501 SW Jefferson Street, which has served as its headquarters and main studios location ever since. The station moved into the new facility in 1965, from an old building located two blocks to the east that the state paid $865,000 for to make way for Interstate 405. The radio facilities moved into the new studios in the spring and the television facilities in July 1965.

In 1992, King Broadcasting (which also included KING-TV in Seattle, KREM-TV in Spokane, Washington, KTVB in Boise, Idaho and KHNL in Honolulu, Hawaii) merged with The Providence Journal Company. Five years later, in 1997, KGW became part of the Belo Corporation when it bought The Providence Journal Company.

High definition and DirecTV
On October 12, 2011, KGW announced that unless a new contract agreement for station carriage could be reached, it would drop its signal from DirecTV's channel lineup. This contract dispute that involved DirecTV and Belo would also remove sister station KING-TV from DirecTV in the Seattle market. On November 1, DirecTV reached an agreement with Belo to resume carrying KGW and KING on DirecTV.

Changes in ownership
On June 13, 2013, the Gannett Company announced that it would acquire Belo. However, since Gannett owns the Statesman Journal newspaper in Salem—within KGW's viewing area—KGW was instead sold to Sander Media, LLC (owned by former Belo executive Jack Sander). However, Gannett operated KGW through joint sales and shared services agreements in order to comply with the FCC's cross-ownership restrictions. The sale was completed on December 23.

On June 29, 2015, Gannett's publishing and digital media operations were spun off, with the latter renamed Tegna. Shortly afterward, Sander Media filed with the FCC to transfer KGW's license to Tegna's King Broadcasting Company; the acquisition was completed on December 3, 2015.

Programming
In addition to the NBC network schedule, KGW airs some local programs such as a daily one-hour talk show called Portland Today and a daily half-hour local newsmagazine The Good Stuff (formerly Live at 7 and Tonight With Cassidy). KGW preempts the Saturday edition of Today in favor of its extended weekend morning newscasts.

Former local programming
Original local programming in the 1970s included the nation's first broadcast nightly television news magazine show, Evening, created by then-news director Ed Godfrey and show producer Michael Sullivan. Originally hosted by Dick Klinger and Robin Chapman, Evening was broadcast Monday through Friday at 7:00 pm; the show premiered September 1, 1975, a year before Westinghouse Broadcasting's KPIX premiered its Evening Magazine and six years before the similar Entertainment Tonight news program. Another innovative show on KGW was the Sunday night public affairs program Open Line, also hosted by Klinger; viewers could phone in and ask a question of that week's guest. Portland's mayor traditionally appeared on the program the first Sunday of the month.

Local programs on KGW during the 1980s included the award-winning quiz show On the Spot (broadcast daily from 1984 to 1988) and the Oregon Lottery game show The Money Game (airing Saturday nights after the 6 p.m. newscast from 1988 to 1990). From 1996 to 2017, KGW aired select Portland Trail Blazers game telecasts; these are now exclusive to Root Sports Northwest (KGW also broadcast all Blazers games as part of NBC's broadcast contract with the NBA from 1990 to 2002, including the team's appearance in the 1992 NBA Finals).

News operation

KGW presently broadcasts 40½ hours of locally produced newscasts each week (with 6½ hours each weekday and four hours each on Saturdays and Sundays).

KGW-TV's original evening news team remained intact for more than seven years—a rarity in the broadcast industry. Anchors Richard Ross and Ivan Smith, commentator Tom McCall, sportscaster Doug LaMear and meteorologist Jack Capell were the faces of KGW's News Beat from sign-on in December 1956 until early 1964, when McCall left the air to run for Oregon Secretary of State. McCall won election that fall, and was elected Governor of Oregon two years later. Ross anchored KGW's nightly newscast Northwest Tonight until 1975, and LaMear and Capell remained on Channel 8 for at least another two decades after Ross' departure for rival KATU (channel 2).

On January 21, 2008, KGW became the first television station in the Portland market to begin broadcasting its local newscasts in high definition. Along with a newly renovated studio, the station shortened its brand from "KGW Northwest NewsChannel 8" to "KGW NewsChannel 8", updated its logo/graphics, and debuted Version 3 of 615 Music's "The Tower" music package. In November 2008, KGW retrofitted its news helicopter with an HD camera.

In 2008–2009, the station developed a high-definition news studio in downtown Portland at Pioneer Courthouse Square, in a space previously occupied by Powell's Books. Regular broadcasts from the location that KGW named the "Studio on the Square" began on March 17, 2009. KGW's noon and 4 p.m. newscasts originate from the downtown location.

Notable current on-air staff
 John Canzano – Sports
 Cathy Marshall – anchor

Notable former on-air staff
 Mel Blanc (deceased 1989, performer on The Hoot Owls)
 Colin Cowherd (now host of Fox Sports Radio's The Herd with Colin Cowherd)
 Ann Curry (former anchor and newsreader on NBC's Today)
 Eric Johnson - sports director (1989-1993; now weeknight anchor for KOMO-TV in Seattle)
 Paul Linnman – host of Evening and PM Magazine (1978–1983; then moved back to KATU, where he had worked before KGW) 
 Ron Magers – producer/news anchor (late 1960s, later at stations like KSTP-TV, WMAQ-TV, and WLS-TV, now retired)
 Tom McCall (Governor of Oregon from 1967 to 1975; deceased)
 Brian McFayden – former anchor, 2016–2017
 John Stossel (later anchor of ABC's 20/20, now at Fox Business Network and Fox News Channel)

Technical information

Subchannels
The station's digital signal is multiplexed:

KGW aired a Portland Trail Blazers game in high-definition for the first time, on October 24, 2007. The following year, KGW began broadcasting all its newscasts in high definition.

KGW provided a 24-hour weather forecast service on digital subchannel 8.2 through the digital television transition, until the September 14, 2009 launch of Estrella TV. On August 2, 2010, KGW restored the 24-hour news and weather channel on 8.2 and moved Estrella TV programming to digital subchannel 8.3. As of December 2012, KGW replaced Live Well Network on KGW 8.2.

Justice Network replaced Live Well Network on January 20, 2015.

On January 16, 2018, KGW activated subchannel 8.4 in anticipation of carrying Quest, which broadcast a preview on a repeated loop until its debut on January 29.

Analog-to-digital conversion
On July 18, 2008 at 6:14 p.m., KGW conducted a test for viewers to determine whether their television sets were ready for the digital transition by turning off its analog signal for 10 seconds, which the station conducted other times through the spring of 2009. In early 2009, KGW, along with other stations that had already added digital television technology, began broadcasting on its digital channel and those without cable or satellite service could purchase "DTA" (Digital to Analog) converter boxes. The U.S. government distributed credit-card "coupons" to get as much as a $50 discount on the boxes, with a limit of two coupons per household. The boxes would accept the digital signal and convert it back to analog so that older televisions could pick up the signal. It is estimated that 20% of television watching households in the Portland area use the over-the-air signal for TV services, making the coupon program very popular in Portland.

KGW shut down its analog signal, over VHF channel 8, at 3:04 a.m. on June 12, 2009, the official date in which full-power television stations in the United States transitioned from analog to digital broadcasts under federal mandate. The station's digital signal relocated from its pre-transition UHF channel 46 to VHF channel 8. At 3:43 a.m., KGW completed its digital conversion when it shut down its temporary digital transmitter (on UHF channel 46) and switched digital operations to channel 8.

Translators

References
Specific references:

General references:

 Station History Page
 HistoryLink essay on Ancil Payne
  Oregonian Article on Portland Radio History

External links

NBC network affiliates
True Crime Network affiliates
Quest (American TV network) affiliates
Twist (TV network) affiliates
This TV affiliates
TheGrio affiliates
Tegna Inc.
Television channels and stations established in 1956
Peabody Award winners
GW
1956 establishments in Oregon